Neodrepanis is a bird genus in the family Philepittidae.

Etymology 
Neodrepanis:  neos “new, strange”; δρεπανη drepanē, δρεπανης drepanēs “scimitar”

Species 
It contains the following species:

References

External links

 
Bird genera
 
Taxonomy articles created by Polbot